Rufus "Speedy" Jones (May 27, 1936 – April 25, 1990) was an American jazz drummer from Charleston, South Carolina.

Starting out on trumpet, Jones switched to drums at the age of 13. He worked with Lionel Hampton in 1954 before being drafted. While stationed at Fort Jackson, Jones played in a quintet every Saturday night at the black United Service Organization clubhouse in Columbia. He later played with Red Allen and Maynard Ferguson's Orchestra (1959–1963). He led a quintet from 1963 to 1964, producing for Cameo Records his only album as a leader. Jones worked with Count Basie and Woody Herman in the mid-1960s and backed that up with Duke Ellington in the latter half of the decade. He also appeared with James Brown.

Rufus' son, Lebrew, was sentenced in 1989 to 22 years to life for the murder of Michaelanne Hall, a prostitute in New York City. He was released on parole on November 19, 2009 after significant doubts were raised about his guilt.

Discography

As leader
 Five on Eight (Cameo, 1964)

As sideman
With Count Basie
 Big Band Scene '65 (Roulette, 1965)
 Arthur Prysock/Count Basie (Verve, 1966)
 Basie's Beat (Verve, 1967)

With Duke Ellington
 The Far East Suite (RCA Victor, 1967)
 Latin American Suite (Fantasy, 1968)
 70th Birthday Concert (Solid State, 1970)
 New Orleans Suite (Atlantic, 1971)
 The London Concert (United Artists, 1972)
 The Pianist (Fantasy, 1974)
 The Afro-Eurasian Eclipse (Fantasy, 1975)
 The Ellington Suites (Pablo, 1976)
 Up in Duke's Workshop (Pablo, 1979)

With Maynard Ferguson
 Let's Face the Music and Dance (Roulette, 1960)
 Maynard '61 (Roulette, 1961)
 Double Exposure with Chris Connor (Atlantic, 1961)
 Two's Company with Chris Connor (Roulette, 1961)
 "Straightaway" Jazz Themes (Roulette, 1961)
 Maynard '62 (Roulette, 1962)
 Si! Si! M.F. (Roulette, 1962)
 Maynard '63 (Roulette, 1962)
 Message from Maynard (Roulette, 1963)
 Maynard '64 (Roulette, 1963)
 The New Sounds of Maynard Ferguson (Cameo, 1963)
 Come Blow Your Horn (Cameo, 1963)

With others
 Al Grey, Shades of Grey (Tangerine, 1965)
 Lionel Hampton, Lionel Hampton Big Band (Clef, 1955)
 Lionel Hampton, Lionel Hampton (Amiga, 1976)
 Johnny Hodges, Triple Play (RCA Victor, 1967)

References 

1936 births
1990 deaths
American jazz drummers
Musicians from Charleston, South Carolina
Count Basie Orchestra members
Swing drummers
20th-century American drummers
American male drummers
American male jazz musicians
20th-century American male musicians